St. John's Wort is a 2001 Japanese horror film directed by Ten Shimoyama, based on Chunsoft's visual novel Otogirisō.

Plot
Toko, Kohei and Shinichi are presented as best friends. After Nami Kaizawa's mother suffered maternal death, she inherited a fortune through her father's will. Toko thanked Nami and Shinichi. After breaking up, Kohei makes Nami a game model. She tells her why she was abandoned and that her father did not raise her. They arrive at the abandoned house where Nami was born. She tells Kohei about her dreams while filming. The caretaker gives a house key to Nami. They enter the gate and notice the garden is filled with St. John's Wort. Nami tells him the last word of the aunt who raised her and Kohei said the meaning of it is revenge in old poems. Kohei records the details. He notices a staircase and asks Nami whether it is the same as the staircase that she saw in her dream but she said it was not. Kohei finds a painting on the wall. Nami fails to open the door. They explore the rooms connected to the main hall. They find an oil painting on the wall and move to the kitchen. Kohei tells Nami she got a talent from her father. Nami returns to the main hall and finds a portrait of her mother. They move upstairs and find a room full with porcelain dolls. They enter another room filled with toys. They later head to the hall.

Cast
 Megumi Okina (Nami Kikushima/Naomi Kaizawa)
 Yōichirō Saitō (Kōhei Matsudaira)
 Kōji Ōkura (Shinichi Ukita)
 Reiko Matsuo (Tōko Ozeki)
 Minoru Terada (Soichi Kaizawa)

Release
St. John's Wort was released in Japan on January 27, 2001. It was shown at the Fantasia Film Festival in Montreal, Canada on July 13, 2001. It was released in both an English-dub and subtitled edition by Asylum Home Entertainment on March 23, 2004.

Reception 
St. John's Wort received mixed critical reviews. Paste Magazine criticized the film's supererogation as a whole, citing the framing device and the visuals to be "way, way too much for what’s supposed to be an atmospheric exploration of a creepy old manor". However, the movie had "enough going on that it’s hard for your attention to wander", and was enough to keep Paste entertained. The movie ranked 42nd out of Paste Magazine's list of 75 live-action video game movies.

References

Footnotes

Sources

External links 
 
 

Films directed by Ten Shimoyama
Japanese horror films
2000s Japanese-language films
2001 films
2001 horror films
Live-action films based on video games
Toho films
2000s Japanese films